Clotilde García del Castillo is an 1890 oil on canvas painting by the Spanish painter Joaquín Sorolla.

Description 
The painting is part of the collection of the Sorolla Museum, in Madrid, Spain.  It is a feminine portrait of a woman, none other than the painter's, Joaquín Sorolla's wife, Clotilde García del Castillo. In the painting, she is found to be sitting on a wooden chair, clad in a black dress, (a sort of a high neck gown) with brown gloves posing for the painting with a tilted posture on the right, her right hand firmly rested on a pillow kept on the chair and her fingers touching her cheek and chin while her left hand rests on the armrest. The elegance and the beauty unfolds as she is found to have her hair binds at the top of her head crowned with a yellow flower.

See also
Señora de Sorolla in Black
Walk on the Beach

References 

1890 paintings
Portraits by Spanish artists
Paintings by Joaquín Sorolla
Paintings in the collection of the Sorolla Museum